Spence Diamonds is a Canadian retailer of diamond jewellery owned by the British firm Lion Capital.  As of September 2021, the chain operated eight locations across three Canadian provinces.

History 
Spence Diamonds was founded in Vancouver in 1978 by Doug Spence and was run for decades by Sean Jones. The company is a major proponent of synthetic diamonds, first stocking them in 2016. It is also noted for its aggressive radio advertising presence featuring Jones portraying a "clownish," screaming character. According to the Harvard Business Press, as of 2012 it was the most profitable diamond retailer in Canada.

In April 2015, Lion Capital acquired Spence Diamonds in a $125 million deal.

The Canada-based Spence Diamonds has tried to enter the United States market several times. In the 1990s the company purchased stores in Minneapolis but closed them and later distanced itself from the attempt. The company purchased three former Robbins Brothers stores in Houston in 2009, but sold them and ceased U.S. operations in early 2011 before re-entering the American market a few years later.

Eric Lindberg, the company's then-chairman, announced plans to expand Spence Diamonds to over 40 locations in North America during a July 2018 interview with Retail Insider. The company opened five United States stores but closed all of them and once again ceased U.S. operations in late 2020, citing the impact of the COVID-19 pandemic. Acting CEO Callum Beveridge said that the would-be expansion would "likely be the last attempt."

Spence Diamonds was the subject of a CBC News investigation in 2013, alleging false advertising and citing that the company received the most Better Business Bureau complaints out of diamond retailers in British Columbia. In response, the company changed its warranty policy.

References

External links 

Jewellery retailers of Canada
Retail companies established in 1978
Companies based in Vancouver